The Ventura 1200 was a proposed French ultralight trike that was designed by Ventura of La Frette, Isère. The aircraft was intended to be supplied as a complete ready-to-fly-aircraft and was announced at Blois 2007. It was shown again at Blois 2011, but it is likely only prototypes were produced before the company went out of business.

Design and development
It features a cable-braced hang glider-style high-wing, weight-shift controls, a two-seats-in-tandem open cockpit with an integral cockpit fairing, tricycle landing gear with wheel pants and a single engine in pusher configuration.

The prototype's fuselage was made from composites, with its double surface Air Creation iXess wing made from aluminum tubing and covered in Dacron sailcloth. The  span wing is supported by a single tube-type kingpost and uses an "A" frame weight-shift control bar. The powerplant is a twin cylinder, air-cooled, four-stroke, dual-ignition  BMW R1200 motorcycle engine that was specially modified by the French engine specialty company Sodemo Moteurs. The propeller is driven via an in-house developed reduction drive.

Specifications (Ventura 1200)

References

External links
Company website archives on Archive.org
Photo of a Ventura 1200

2000s French sport aircraft
2000s French ultralight aircraft
Single-engined pusher aircraft
Ultralight trikes